Martin George Blinder (born 1937) is a physician and forensic psychiatrist licensed to practice in Hawaii, California, Kentucky and Georgia.  He is editor-in-chief of the academic journal Family Therapy, a former assistant clinical professor of psychiatry at the University of California, San Francisco, and a former adjunct professor of law at the University of California, Hastings College of the Law.  He was instrumental in the development of the use of lithium carbonate for treatment of bipolar disorder and in winning FDA approval for use of this drug in the United States.

In the early 1970s he was a city councilman and mayor of San Anselmo, California, and authored the first law restricting public smoking in the United States.  He is author of Psychiatry in the Everyday Practice of Law, Fourth Edition (Thomson/West), Lovers, Killers, Husbands and Wives (St. Martin's Press), Fluke (Permanent Press), Choosing Lovers (Glenbridge Publishing) and The Lucrecia Borgia Cookbook (Renaissance Press), as well as author of articles for the Journal of the American Medical Association, The Archives of General Psychiatry, The American Journal of Neuropsychiatry, Judicature, Journal of the California State Bar Association, Journal of the Hawaiian State Bar Association, and Journal of the American Bar Association, among many others.

He has primary offices in Ka'a'wa, Hawaii, and San Anselmo/San Francisco, California.

Trial of Dan White

Blinder is noted for his testimony in the 1979 trial of Dan White.  In that trial, Blinder testified that White was suffering from depression and pointed to several behavioral symptoms of that depression, including the claim that White had gone from being highly health-conscious to consuming sugary foods and drinks such as Twinkies and Coca-Cola.  A remark by Blinder that the sugar might have worsened such a depression was widely reported as a claim that the sugar had contributed to the depression, giving rise to the derisive label of the "Twinkie defense," for defendants' claims that an unusual biological factor contributed to their commission of a crime.

References

Citations

General references
 
 Snopes: The Twinkie Defense
 Three part 2001 SF Chronicle series on Martin Blinder's personal/professional life

External links
Martin Blinder

1937 births
Living people
American psychiatrists
Mayors of places in California
University of California, San Francisco faculty
Psychiatry academics
American non-fiction writers
Theorists in psychiatry